The 1998–99 Venezuelan Professional Baseball League season ( or LVBP):

Regular season standings

Eastern Division

Western Division

(C)Classified to the Round Robin

Wild Card

(#)Zulia and La Guaira played a one-game playoff

Round robin

(C)Classified to the Championship series.

Championship series

Cardenales de Lara LVBP 1998-1999 Champions

Awards

Most Valuable Player (Víctor Davalillo Award): Luis Raven (Los Llanos)

Overall Offensive Performer of the year: Luis Raven (Los Llanos)

Rookie of the year: Luis Rivas (Magallanes)

Comeback of the year: Pedro Castellano (Aragua)

Pitcher of the year (Carrao Bracho Award): Mike Romano (Lara)

Reliever of the year: Orber Moreno (Caracas)

LVBP seasons